Kate Thornton (born 7 February 1973) is an English journalist and broadcaster, best known as the first presenter of The X Factor (2004–2006) and for presenting daytime shows including Loose Women (2009–2011) and This Morning (2009–2012). In 2010, she co-presented the first series of 71 Degrees North alongside Gethin Jones.

Career

Journalism

In 1995, she became the first female and youngest ever editor of pop magazine Smash Hits at age 22, producing her first issue in February 1996 covering the breakup of boy-band Take That. She left a year later, having been unable to prevent a further slide in sales of the magazine. In 1997, she became a Features Editor at the Sunday Times, a post she held until 2001, and also a contributing Editor for magazine Marie Claire, in which position she continued until 2003.

Television
Whilst undertaking these new editorial roles, Thornton began a second career in television. In February 1997, Thornton was given her first TV presenting job, on the ITV current affairs programme Straight Up. She was tasked with putting together a photo tribute with music for Princess Diana on the day of her death. In an interview in March 2011, Thornton said: "...because it was a Sunday, the music library was shut and the only thing I had in my car, the only piece of music that was appropriate was "Candle in the Wind" from Elton John's greatest hits." Colleagues attributed the subsequent airplay and then the re-recording of the song to this event. Thornton is quoted as having been doubtful initially, but later having come to accept the possibility: "I never dared to assume for one minute that I was the link. But Nick Knowles (co-presenter on the show) has convinced me that whatever came as a result of it was all down to me."

Thornton was the first presenter of the UK series of The X Factor. She presented three series of the show from 2004 until 2006 before being replaced by Dermot O'Leary. Thornton later anchored ITV's daytime series Loose Women, in rotation with Andrea McLean. She presented 233 episodes of the show from 2009 until 2011. She was replaced by Carol Vorderman.

Thornton was a regular stand-in presenter on This Morning and in 2010, she co-presented the first series of 71 Degrees North alongside Gethin Jones. Neither returned for the second series. In 2010, she narrated The Nation's Favourite Abba Song. Thornton also presented A Night with Will Young in 2011. She guest presented six episodes of Lorraine in 2012.

Thornton also presented Gravity Games for BBC Two, Women: The Naked Truth Honest for Channel 4 and Breasts Uncupped for Sky1.

Radio
Thornton has presented a number of programmes for BBC Radio 2 since 2002. Along with presenting, Thornton was also the writer of the radio documentary From Band to Brand in 2004, and the creator of the radio series Line of Enquiry, inviting an audience to put questions to a number of celebrities, which began in 2007.

From 10 March until 28 April 2013, Thornton presented The Boots Feel Good Forum, a radio show dedicated to health and fitness, which aired on Real Radio and Smooth Radio.

Since 2014, Thornton has presented Paper Cuts, a radio series for BBC Radio 2, She joined Greatest Hits Radio on 26 February 2022 and has replaced Darren Proctor on Saturday nights.

Other work
Thornton launched cashback site TBSeen in January 2016, along with TV presenters Myleene Klass, Amanda Byram and Denise Van Outen, celebrity chef Lisa Faulkner, actresses Tamzin Outhwaite, Julie Graham and singers Heidi Range and the band All Saints, Nicole Appleton, Natalie Appleton, Mel Blatt and Shaznay Lewis. TBSeen entered administration in September 2018.

Thornton hosted the live Strictly Come Dancing tour in 2008, 2009, 2010, 2012 and 2013.

Thornton currently hosts the Yahoo! podcast "White Wine Question Time" where she asks three friends three questions over three bottles of wine. Guests have included Jo Joyner, Nadia Sawalha, Malin Andersson, Leigh Francis, Angela Griffin and Amanda Holden. The podcast first aired in December 2018. During the UK's COVID-19 lockdown in 2020, she also created and hosted "Up Close And Socially Distant", a video series for Yahoo!, where she talked over the phone to famous celebrities, front line workers and those leading initiatives to help serve the community during lockdown. The show ran for nine weeks.

Personal life
Thornton began dating DJ Darren Emerson in 2004. The couple became engaged in 2007. She gave birth to her first child, a boy named Ben on 13 May 2008. On 3 February 2011, she announced live on air that she and Emerson had separated.

In January 2012, Thornton said that after leaving Loose Women she had enrolled at college to study counselling because her television career had "hit the kerb".

She has been in a relationship with construction worker Mat Vincent since 2013.

Filmography
Television

Radio

References

External links
 
 Kate Thornton's CV
 Kate Thornton on Greatest Hits Radio

1973 births
English journalists
English music journalists
English television presenters
People from Cheltenham
Living people
English women journalists
Women writers about music
Top of the Pops presenters